There have been several deficit reduction commissions, including:
 National Commission on Fiscal Responsibility and Reform (United States, 2010)
 National Economic Commission (United States, 1987)
 Peterson Pew Commission on Budget Reform (United States, 2008)
 Rivlin-Domenici deficit reduction commission (United States, 2010)